This is a list of 100 species of May beetles and junebugs within the genus Serica, which is in the family Scarabaeidae.

Serica species

References

Serica